Drew Goldsack (born August 23, 1981) is a Canadian cross-country skier who has  competed since 2001. His best finish at the FIS Nordic World Ski Championships was sixth in the team sprint (with Devon Kershaw) in 2007 while his best individual finish was 21st in the sprint in 2005. Drew recorded a 1st-place finish at the 2004 U23 FIS World Championships in the individual sprint as well as a 3rd-place finish in the team sprint (with Devon Kershaw). Drew's best FIS World Cup result was a fifth in the team sprint (with Len Väljas in Duesseldorf, GER in 2011 with. His best individual World Cup result was 11th place in the sprint event in Canmore in 2007.

Competing in two Winter Olympics, Goldsack's best individual finish at the Winter Olympics was 31st in the sprint event at Turin in 2006.

He won the NorAm Sprint championship (2011)

He has a number of individual career victories in sprint events at various levels in Canada (2003, 2006, 2009, 2010, 2011).
He has a number of individual career victories in various events at NorAm levels in North America (3003, 2006, 2009, 2010, 2011).

He won the aggregate Senior Canadian National Championship (2003)

He won the aggregate Junior Canadian National Championship (2001)

Cross-country skiing results
All results are sourced from the International Ski Federation (FIS).

Olympic Games

World Championships

World Cup

Season standings

References

External links

1981 births
Canadian male cross-country skiers
Jewish Canadian sportspeople
Cross-country skiers at the 2006 Winter Olympics
Cross-country skiers at the 2010 Winter Olympics
Living people
Olympic cross-country skiers of Canada